Athina Papafotiou is a female professional volleyball player from Greece. She plays as setter.

In 2014-15, Athina Papafotiou played for Allianz MTV Stuttgart. There, Papafotiou played alongside Kim Renkema who later became the club's sporting director.

In April 2020, she returned to Stuttgart.

In Mai 2021, she signed with Panathinaikos again after ten years of absence.

Awards and accomplishments

Pro career
A1 Ethniki Women's Volleyball champion
2011, 2012, 2022

Greek Women's Volleyball Cup winner
2022

German Women's Volleyball League cup winner
2015

French Women's Volleyball League winner
2017

Italian Women's Volleyball League winner
2018

Personal Awards
French Women's Volleyball League MVP
2019

French Women's Volleyball League Best Passer
2016, 2017, 2019

References

1989 births
Living people
Panathinaikos Women's Volleyball players
Greek expatriate sportspeople in France
Greek expatriate sportspeople in Germany
Greek expatriate sportspeople in Poland
Greek women's volleyball players
Volleyball players from Athens